Salisbury Railroad Corridor Historic District is a national historic district located at Salisbury, Rowan County, North Carolina.  The district encompasses 37 contributing buildings and 1 contributing site consisting primarily of railroad-related and commercial buildings.  It largely developed during the first half of the 20th century, and includes notable examples of Mission Revival style architecture. Located in the district is the separately listed Salisbury Southern Railroad Passenger Depot designed by Frank Pierce Milburn.  Other notable buildings include the Cheerwine/Carolina Beverage Corporation Building (1913), Yadkin Hotel (1913), Frick Building (c. 1905), Boyden-Overman Company Cotton Warehouse (c. 1910), and Old Freight Depot (c. 1907).

It was listed on the National Register of Historic Places in 1987, with a boundary increase in 2003.

References

External links

Historic districts on the National Register of Historic Places in North Carolina
Mission Revival architecture in North Carolina
Buildings and structures in Salisbury, North Carolina
National Register of Historic Places in Rowan County, North Carolina